Miloš Nikolić  (born 22 February 1989) is a Serbian footballer who plays as a centre back.

Club career
Nikolić was signed by Spartak Trnava in January 2015. He made his league debut for them against Spartak Myjava on 28 February 2015.

References

External links
 

1989 births
Living people
Serbian footballers
Serbian expatriate footballers
FK Teleoptik players
FK Jagodina players
FK Dinamo Vranje players
FK Srem players
FK Metalac Gornji Milanovac players
FK Smederevo players
FK Sloga Kraljevo players
FC ViOn Zlaté Moravce players
FC Spartak Trnava players
1. FK Příbram players
FC Urartu players
Serbian SuperLiga players
Slovak Super Liga players
Czech First League players
Armenian Premier League players
Premier League of Bosnia and Herzegovina players
Serbian expatriate sportspeople in Slovakia
Serbian expatriate sportspeople in the Czech Republic
Serbian expatriate sportspeople in Bosnia and Herzegovina
Serbian expatriate sportspeople in Armenia
Expatriate footballers in Slovakia
Expatriate footballers in the Czech Republic
Expatriate footballers in Bosnia and Herzegovina
Expatriate footballers in Armenia
Association football central defenders